East Down may refer to:

East Down, Devon, a village in England
The eastern part of County Down in Northern Ireland
East Down (Northern Ireland Parliament constituency)
East Down (UK Parliament constituency), former constituency in County Down, Northern Ireland

See also
Down East (disambiguation)